Qhawana (Quechua for viewpoint, window, Hispanicized spelling Cahuana) is an  extinct volcano at the border of Bolivia and Chile which reaches a height of approximately . It is located in the Potosí Department, Sud Lípez Province, San Pablo de Lípez Municipality. Qhawana lies on the western border of the Eduardo Avaroa Andean Fauna National Reserve, south of Silala.

References 

Volcanoes of Potosí Department